

Plants

Pinophytes

Archosauromorphs

Dinosaurs
Data courtesy of George Olshevsky's dinosaur genera list.

References

1950s in paleontology
Paleontology